Richard Starks (born February 21, 1990), is an American professional wrestler currently signed to All Elite Wrestling (AEW). He also serves on the commentary team for AEW's sister streaming television program, Elevation. Starks is also known for his time with the National Wrestling Alliance (NWA), where he was the inaugural winner of the revived NWA World Television Championship.

Professional wrestling career

Early career (2012–2019)
Starks idolized wrestlers including The Undertaker, The Rock, and Mankind, among many others, while growing up watching professional wrestling. Around the age of seven, Starks decided he would pursue his dream of becoming a professional wrestler. Starks made his debut in WWE as enhancement talent, jobbing to Jinder Mahal, before debuting for the National Wrestling Alliance's (NWA) Velocity Pro Wrestling on October 14, 2012 at the NWA Velocity Haunted Havoc event in Austin, Texas. There, he wrestled in a triple threat match against Jaykus Plisken and Big Ricky. Since 2012, Starks became a regular talent featured across numerous promotions in the state of Texas, like Anarchy Championship Wrestling and Inspire Pro Wrestling.

During the following years, he worked four other matches for WWE as an enhancement talent, losing against wrestlers like Jinder Mahal, Enzo Amore and Colin Cassady, Kane and The Revival (Scott Dawson and Dash Wilder). On the July 29, 2013 episode of Raw, he appeared in a backstage video where he was bullied, mocked, and slammed through a table by Ryback. Starks again made an appearance on the March 19, 2018 episode of Raw as a US Marshal, arresting Roman Reigns, only for Starks to be attacked by Reigns.

National Wrestling Alliance (2018–2020) 
Starks made his debut for the National Wrestling Alliance (NWA) at the NWA 70th Anniversary Show on October 21, 2018, competing in a four-way elimination match against Jay Bradley, Mike Parrow and Willie Mack, which Mack won. He returned on the October 15, 2019 episode of Power, defeating Trevor Murdoch. At the Into the Fire pay-per-view event on December 14, Starks competed in a three-way match against Colt Cabana and Aron Stevens for the NWA National Championship, a match which Stevens won. Soon after, Starks was entered into a tournament to determine the inaugural holder of the NWA World Television Championship. At the Hard Times event on January 24, 2020, he defeated Eddie Kingston in the first round, Matt Cross in the second round, Tim Storm in the semi-finals and Trevor Murdoch in the finals to become the new NWA World Television Champion. Starks lost the title to Zicky Dice on the March 3 episode of Power. On May 18, it was announced that Starks was no longer with the NWA as his contract had expired.

All Elite Wrestling (2020–present)

Team Taz (2020–2022)  
On the June 17 episode of Dynamite, Starks made his unannounced debut for All Elite Wrestling (AEW) as he answered Cody's open challenge for the AEW TNT Championship in a losing effort. After the match, All Elite Wrestling's CEO Tony Khan announced that Starks had signed with AEW. On the June 30 episode of Dark, Starks picked up his first victory in AEW by defeating Griff Garrison while quickly establishing himself as a heel. On the July 21 episode of Dark, after defeating Will Hobbs, Starks aided Brian Cage in attacking Robert Anthony and Darby Allin after their match, creating an alliance between the two. The team, managed by Taz and now known as Team Taz, began feuding with Allin as they faced Allin and Jon Moxley on the July 29 episode of Dynamite where they were defeated. At the All Out pay-per-view on September 5, Starks participated in the Casino Battle Royale, but he was eliminated by Allin. On the September 30 episode of Dynamite, Starks was defeated by Allin in a singles match. 

On the November 18, 2020 episode of Dynamite, Will Hobbs would join Starks, Taz, and Cage's alliance after he struck Cody with Cage's FTW Championship belt and then assisted them in attacking both Allin and Cody as well. On the December 2, 2020 special Winter Is Coming, Starks and Hobbs, the latter now known as Powerhouse Hobbs, would lose a tag team match to Cody and Allin, after which, Sting made his AEW debut and ran Team Taz off after a post-match attack. On the January 20 episode of Dynamite, it was announced that Starks and Brian Cage would be facing Allin and Sting in a street fight at Revolution, a cinematic match that Starks and Cage ultimately lost. On July 14, 2021, on night one of Fyter Fest, Starks won the FTW World Championship from Brian Cage, winning his first championship in AEW, although the FTW title is not an officially sanctioned championship the company. On an episode of Rampage, Starks defeated Cage in a Philly street fight. Starks would qualify for the "Face of the Revolution" ladder match by defeating Preston "10" Vance, but would fail to win the match at Revolution.

In September 2021, in addition to still being a wrestler on the show, Starks joined the Rampage commentary team, replacing Mark Henry.

On the July 20, 2022 episode of Dynamite, Starks issued an open challenge for he FTW Championship, where he defeated Cole Karter. After the match, he issued another open challenge for the following week's Dynamite, which was answered by Danhausen.

World championship pursuits (2022–present)
At Fight for the Fallen on July 27, 2022, Starks issued an open challenge immediately after defeating Danhausen. It was answered by Team Taz teammate Hook, who defeated him for the title, ending Starks's reign at 378 days, making him the longest-reigning FTW Champion. After a post-match impassioned promo by Starks, Powerhouse Hobbs attacked him, turning Starks face.  The following week Taz, while on commentary, announced that he had dissolved Team Taz. Starks came out to confront Hobbs on the August 3rd episode of Dynamite, only for his former partner to hit him with a spinebuster and leave the ring. The grudge match between Hobbs and Starks was set for All Out, where Hobbs defeated Starks in just over 5 minutes. Starks and Hobbs faced off once more at Grand Slam in an Unsanctioned Lights Out match, where Starks defeated Hobbs, ending the feud.

On the 23rd of November episode of Dynamite, Starks defeated Ethan Page in the finals of an AEW World Championship Eliminator Tournament to face champion Maxwell Jacob Friedman at Winter Is Coming for the AEW World Championship. Two weeks later, on the December 7 edition of Dynamite, Starks competed in the Dynamite Dozen Battle Royale, last eliminating Ethan Page to add the Dynamite Diamond Ring as a second prize to his AEW World Championship match. The following week on Dynamite, Starks and Friedman faced off in a heated promo, with Starks insulting Friedman's cheap tactics of gaining acclaim, compared to the hard work Starks put in, resulting in Friedman hitting Starks with a low blow, only for Starks to retaliate with a spear, knocking Friedman down. The following week at Winter is Coming, MJF defeated Starks, retaining the AEW World Championship and winning the Dynamite Diamond Ring.

Professional wrestling style and persona
Starks referred to his style as a "pastiche" of other wrestlers, most notably The Undertaker's selling and Shinjiro Otani.

Filmography

Television

Championships and accomplishments 
All Elite Wrestling
AEW World Championship Eliminator Tournament (2022)
Dynamite Diamond Battle Royale (2022) 
FTW Championship (1 time)
Anarchy Championship Wrestling
ACW Hardcore Championship (1 time)
ACW Televised Championship (1 time)
ACW Unified Championship (1 time)
Dojo Pro Wrestling
Dojo Pro White Belt Championship (1 time)
ESPN
Breakthrough wrestler of the year (2022)
Imperial Wrestling Revolution
IWR Revolutionary Championship (1 time)
Inspire Pro Wrestling
Inspire Pro Championship (1 time)
Inspire Pro Junior Crown Championship (1 time)
Inspire Pro Pure Prestige Championship (1 time)
National Wrestling Alliance
NWA World Television Championship (1 time, inaugural)
NWA World Television Championship Tournament (2020)
NWA Houston
NWA Lone Star Junior Heavyweight Championship (1 time)
Pro Wrestling Illustrated
 Ranked No. 92 of the top 500 singles wrestlers in the PWI 500 in 2020
VIP Wrestling
VIP Tag Team Championships (1 time) - with Carson
VIP Tag Team Championship Tournament (2015)
WrestleCircus
WC Big Top Tag Team Championships (1 time) - with Aaron Solow
Xtreme Championship Wrestling
XCW Heavyweight Championship (1 time, current)

References

External links

1990 births
21st-century professional wrestlers
All Elite Wrestling personnel
American male professional wrestlers
Living people
Professional wrestlers from Louisiana
Sportspeople from New Orleans
Professional wrestling announcers
NWA World Television Champions
FTW Champions